Jacek Krzyżaniak (born 18 October 1968 in Toruń, Poland) is a former international motorcycle speedway rider from Poland, who was a member of Poland national team and won silver medals at 1997 Speedway World Team Cup and 2001 Speedway World Cup. He won Individual Polish Champion title in 1997 and Team Polish Champion title in 1990.

Speedway Grand Prix results

Career details

World Championships 
 Individual World Championship (Speedway Grand Prix)
 1998 - 30th place (3 points in German SGP)
 Team World Championship (Speedway World Team Cup and Speedway World Cup)
 1992 - 2nd place in Group B (14 points)
 1993 - 3rd place in Group A (7 points)
 1997 -  Piła - Runner-up (0 points)
 2001 -  Wrocław - Runner-up (0 points)

European Championships 
 Individual European Championship
 2004 -  Holsted - 5th place (10 points)

Domestic competitions 

 Individual Speedway Polish Championship
 1994 -  Wrocław - Runner-up
 1997 -  Częstochowa - Polish Champion
 1999 -  Bydgoszcz - Bronze medal
 2000 -  Piła - Bronze medal
 2002 -  Toruń - Bronze medal
 Team Speedway Polish Championship
 1990 - Polish Champion
 1991 - Bronze medal
 1992 - Bronze medal
 1993 - Bronze medal
 1994 - Bronze medal
 1995 - Runner-up
 1996 - Runner-up
 1999 - Runner-up
 2001 - Runner-up
 2002 - Bronze medal
 2003 - Bronze medal
 2005 - Runner-up
 Polish Golden Helmet
 1994 -  Wrocław - Bronze medal
 1999 -  Wrocław - Winner

See also 
 Poland national speedway team
 List of Speedway Grand Prix riders

External links 
 (pl) GTŻ Grudziądz webside

1968 births
Living people
Polish speedway riders
Polish speedway champions
Polonia Bydgoszcz riders
Sportspeople from Toruń